Mendocino Unified School District is a public school district in Mendocino County, California, United States.

Schools

Secondary schools

High schools 
 Mendocino High
 Mendocino Alternative
 Mendocino Community High
 Mendocino Sunrise High

K–8 schools 
 Mendocino K-8

K–3 schools 
 Albion Elementary
 Comptche Elementary

Pre-K 
 Greenwood Preschool

References

External links 
 

School districts in Mendocino County, California
Education in Mendocino County, California